The Nikon 1 J2 is a Nikon 1 series high-speed mirrorless interchangeable-lens camera launched by Nikon. Nikon lists the estimated selling price of the Nikon 1 J2 One-Lens Kit in the United States at $549.95. This kit comes with the 1 NIKKOR VR 10-30mm f/3.5-5.6 lens.

The Nikon 1 J2 is the successor of the Nikon 1 J1. The successor is the Nikon 1 J3.

Features list 
 Effective Pixels: 10.1 million
 Sensor Size: 13.2mmx 8.8mm
 Image Sensor Format: CX
 Storage Media: SD, SDHC, SDXC
 5 frames per second
 10, 30 or 60 fps using Electronic (Hi) shutter
 ISO Sensitivity: 100–3200, max expandable: 6400
 Audio file format: ACC
 Movie file format: MOV
 Monitor Size: 3.0 in. diagonal
 Monitor Type: TFT-LCD with brightness adjustment
 Battery: EN-EL20 Lithium-ion Battery
 Approx. Dimensions: 
 Approx. Weight:

See also

 Nikon 1 series
 Nikon 1-mount

References 

Nikon MILC cameras
J2
Cameras introduced in 2013